Planète Sauvage (French for "Wild Planet" or "Savage Planet") may refer to:

 Fantastic Planet, a 1973 French-Czechoslovakian animated science fiction film, titled La Planète sauvage in French
 Planete Sauvage (safari park), opened in 1992 and located near Port-Saint-Père, France